This is a list of films produced and/or released by American film studio TriStar Pictures. Some of the films listed here were distributed theatrically in the United States by the company's distribution division, Sony Pictures Releasing (formerly known as Triumph Releasing Corporation (1982–1994) and Columbia TriStar Film Distributors International (1988–2005).

1980s

1990s

2000s

2010s

2020s

Upcoming

Undated films

References

TriStar
Sony Pictures Entertainment Motion Picture Group

TriStar